Seed of 6ix is a Memphis, Tennessee rap group composed of Locodunit (Thomas Dunigan) and Lil Infamous (Ricky Dunigan, Jr.), who are the nephews of the co-founder of hip hop group Three 6 Mafia, DJ Paul (Paul Beauregard). Lil Infamous is also the son of former co-founder Lord Infamous (Ricky Dunigan).

History

Locodunit and Lil Infamous started the group in late 2014 and released their debut album Faces of Gospel on February 6, 2015. The album is available on various digital platforms. Their style is widely considered as horrorcore, crunk and gangsta rap.
The group began in 2014 in Memphis, Tennessee with Lil Infamous (Ricky Dunigan, Jr.) and Locodunit (Thomas Dunigan) for the sake of rapper DJ Paul. Seed of 6ix released several Mixtapes & EPs starting with Planet 6ix Chpt 3.6 on May 1, 2015. As well as solo projects on Young N Dumb, their independent label. Signed to Scale-A-Ton Entertainment DJ Paul's label in 2018. DJ Paul is responsible for bringing a fault into the reckoning against the group's musical career    and has since produced numerous singles and the last work for the group was released the first album Faces of Gospel (2015). The name comes from hip hop group Three 6 Mafia (The Seed of 6ix).

The duo is a collaboration between Lil Infamous and Locodunit, who are well-established individual recording artists in the underground hip hop scene in Memphis, Tennessee. Their first collaboration was on the debut album "Planet 6ix Chpt 3.6" (2016), with them appearing regularly on each other's albums thereafter.

In 2016, the duo released "Seed Of 6ix Chapter 2", which turned out to be the biggest commercial success for both artists. The album was released on Young N Dumb. The album reached number 62 on the Billboard 200, number 10 on the Top R&B/Hip-Hop Albums chart and number 7 on the Top Rap Albums chart. Earlier, the artists had 2 appearances in the Top R&B / Hip-Hop chart among them, this was the first in the top 10.

The first release of Scale-A-Ton Entertainment was a double singles titled "Break The Law" (2016), "Lyrical Drive By" (2017), "Get Buck" (2018). It was released in 2018 by the independent label.

Locodunit's younger brother, Ant Dunit (Timothy Dunigan), is also a rapper and sometimes appears on Seed of 6ix albums.

Studio albums

References

External links
 ob iTunes
 on Vevo
 on Discogs

 FreeListening on SoundCloud

American crunk groups
African-American musical groups
American musical duos
Columbia Records artists
Gangsta rap groups
Horrorcore groups
Musical groups established in 2014
Musical groups from Memphis, Tennessee
Rappers from Memphis, Tennessee
2014 establishments in Tennessee